Refuge Carate Brianza is a refuge in the Alps.

Mountain huts in the Alps
Mountain huts in Lombardy
Lanzada